Battle royal (also royale) traditionally refers to a fight involving many combatants that is fought until only one fighter remains standing, usually conducted under either boxing or wrestling rules. In recent times, the term has been used in a more general sense to refer to any fight involving large numbers of people who are not organized into factions. Within combat sports and professional wrestling, the term has a specific meaning, depending on the sports being discussed.

Outside sports, the term battle royale has taken on a new meaning in the 21st century, redefined by Koushun Takami's 1999 Japanese dystopian novel Battle Royale and its 2000 film adaptation of the same name. This new meaning of "battle royale" refers to a fictional narrative genre and/or mode of entertainment inspired by the film, also known as death games and killing games, where a select group of people are instructed to kill one another until there is a triumphant survivor.

Sports

Historical uses

The label of "battle royal" has been applied to several events. In the 1700s in the United Kingdom, some bare-knuckle boxing conducted according to Jack Broughton's rules included matches involving eight fighters.  Referred to as "Broughton's Battle Royals", these events were spoofed in political cartoons of the era. The practice eventually fell out of favor in the United Kingdom, but it continued in the American colonies. Lower-class whites who lived in the backwoods practiced the "free-for-all" as well as "rough-and-tumble". The practice also spread to American slaves, who held mass fights as a form of entertainment. Frederick Douglass wrote that such distractions, as well as the consumption of alcohol, were "among the most effective in the hands of the slaveholder in keeping down the spirit of insurrection."  While a few masters sanctioned slave boxers (as shown in the 2012 film Django Unchained), this practice appears to have been rare, as slaveholders generally did not wish to damage their property. The majority of these events were run by the slaves themselves for their own amusement.

After the American Civil War, the battle royal entered a popular phase, but such events were increasingly considered shameful and disreputable. Promoters of boxing events arranged for brutal free-for-alls with few rules, generally between black boxers. The audience for these spectacles were almost always white people, unlike the pre-War entertainment within the enslaved community. A battle royal was a frequent "opener" event for boxing and wrestling shows from about 1870 to about 1910. They originated and were most popular in the American South, but they eventually spread to the North as well. However, the events fell out of favor, especially in the North. In New York, the State Athletic Commission banned the battle royal in 1911. They continued in the South from the 1910s to the 1950s, but with less popularity. The novel Invisible Man (1952) by Ralph Ellison contains a depiction of one such brutal event. By the 1960s, battles royal had been banned even in the American South.Wrestling With The Past: The Bizarre Origins of the Battle Royal - Part Two 

The battle royal was a way for a would-be boxer to get noticed, and successful battle royal champions gained enough prestige to be able to work their way up to taking part in more  respectable boxing matches. Ken Burn’s documentary about Jack Johnson mentions his background in battles royal, and Joe Gans and Beau Jack are two other examples of successful boxers who started in battles royal.

Professional wrestling

In professional wrestling, the battle royal is a match involving anywhere between four and 60 wrestlers that takes place entirely inside the ring — a wrestler is eliminated when a wrestler scores a pinfall or knocks out his or her opponent(s) (but rarely submissions). Some promotions allow over the top rope eliminations or enforce them exclusively, notably normal battles royal in the WWE and also in their annual Royal Rumble. Battles royal are often used to determine the top contender for a championship or filling vacant championships.

World Championship Wrestling was known for having the largest battle royal in wrestling, held annually at their WCW World War 3 pay-per-view events.  The three-ring, sixty-wrestler events consisted of all sixty wrestlers parading out to the ring (usually without formal introductions to save time) and beginning to fight at the bell.  Once the number of wrestlers in each ring had dwindled down to a number suitable for a single ring, the wrestlers would all move to the designated "Ring #1" out of the three and would fight to a winner. The winners of the four World War 3 battles royal were Randy Savage, The Giant, Scott Hall, and Kevin Nash.

World Championship Wrestling also held an event called Battlebowl in which 20 men started in one ring and would have to throw others into a second ring. From that ring you would be thrown to the floor for elimination. The last man in ring one would rest until one man was left in ring two. Those two men would then battle until one man was left and would be declared the winner. In 1991 Sting won the match after it coming down to him and Lex Luger. Every year thereafter Battle Bowl took place with only one ring and a normal battle royal. The entrants would be decided through tag-team matches consisting of randomly selected partners where the winning team would advance to the BattleBowl, called a "Lethal Lottery" by WCW due to the potentiality of rivals being forced to work as a team. 

Numerous variations of the battle royal also exist, including:
 World Wrestling Entertainment's Royal Rumble: an over-the-top rope elimination match which starts with two competitors and adds a new competitor every two minutes, usually up to a total of thirty entrants, with the final remaining competitor being the winner
 Total Nonstop Action Wrestling's Gauntlet for the Gold: an over-the-top rope elimination match in which the final two competitors face off in a one-fall singles match
 Tag Team Battle Royal: a standard battle royal in which teams of two, three, or four combatants compete for group victory. Variations have been used in both WCW and TNA.
 All Elite Wrestling's Royal Rampage: an over-the-top rope elimination match which involves two rings and, as of 2022, 20 competitors. Loosely based on WCW's World War 3 matches.

Battle royale genre

In the 21st century, the 2000 Japanese film Battle Royale, itself based on the 1999 novel of the same name, redefined the term "battle royale" in popular culture. The term "battle royale" has since been used to refer to a fictional narrative genre and/or mode of entertainment inspired by the film, where a select group of people are instructed to kill one another until there is a triumphant survivor. The "battle royale" phenomenon became especially popular in the 2010s. Battle Royale set out the basic rules of the genre, including players being forced to kill each other until there is a single survivor and the need to scavenge for weapons and items. The "battle royale" concept had first gained mainstream popularity in Japan, where Battle Royale had inspired a wave of manga, anime and visual novel works during the 2000s, before the concept gained global mainstream popularity in the 2010s.

There are a number of popular battle royale video games, films, manga, anime, and visual novels. Along with the Battle Royale franchise itself, other examples of battle royale films include The Hunger Games franchise (2012 debut), The Purge (2013), Assassination Nation (2018), Ready or Not (2019), and The Hunt (2020). A popular Battle Royale inspired television series include the Japanese TV series Alice in Borderland (2020), as well as the South Korean show Squid Game (2021). Popular examples of battle royale games include PlayerUnknown's Battlegrounds (2017), Fortnite Battle Royale (2017), Rules of Survival (2017), Garena Free Fire (2017), Call of Duty: Black Ops 4 (2018), Apex Legends (2019), Call of Duty: Warzone (2020), and Fall Guys: Ultimate Knockout (2020).

Along with the Battle Royale manga (2000 debut), other examples of battle royale manga, anime, and tokusatsu, include Gantz (2000 debut),,  Kamen Rider Ryuki (2002 debut), Basilisk (2003 debut), Bokurano (2003 debut), the Fate/stay night franchise (2005 manga and 2006 anime debut), Future Diary (2006 debut), Deadman Wonderland (2007 debut), Btooom! (2009 debut), the Danganronpa franchise (2010 debut), Magical Girl Raising Project (2012 debut), Darwin's Game (2012 debut), and Kamen Rider Geats (2022 debut).

Examples of battle royale visual novel games include the Fate/stay night series (2004 debut), Dies irae (2007), the Zero Escape series (2009 debut), and the Danganronpa series (2010 debut). Fictional battle royale video games were depicted in Btooom!, and in the Phantom Bullet (Gun Gale Online) arc of the light novel series Sword Art Online (2010 in print) as the "Bullet of Bullets" tournament.

See also
 Battle royale game
 Gladiators
 King of the Hill (game)
 Melee

References

 
Tournament systems